Thunderbolts of Fate is a 1919 American silent drama film directed by Edward Warren and starring House Peters, Anna Lehr and Ned Burton.

Cast
 House Peters as Robert Wingfield
 Anna Lehr as Eleanor Brewster
 Ned Burton as Sen. Brewster
 Wilfred Lytell as Clifford Brewster
 Ben Lewin as Edward Brewster
 Henry Sedley as Howard Lennox
 Corene Uzzell as Adele Hampton

References

Bibliography
 Paul C. Spehr & Gunnar Lundquist. American Film Personnel and Company Credits, 1908-1920. McFarland, 1996.

External links
 

1919 films
1919 drama films
1910s English-language films
American silent feature films
Silent American drama films
American black-and-white films
Films directed by Edward Warren
Films distributed by W. W. Hodkinson Corporation
Pathé Exchange films
1910s American films